Jonathan Bellemare (born June 10, 1982) is a Canadian retired professional ice hockey player. He played the centre position for the ASG Angers in France and HC Martigny of the National League B in Switzerland. Prior to his professional career in Europe, he played with the Shawinigan Cataractes and Hull Olympiques of the Quebec Major Junior Hockey League (QMJHL).

External links
Jonathan Bellemare on EuroHockey.net

Living people
Shawinigan Cataractes players
Hull Olympiques players
Ice hockey people from Quebec
Canadian ice hockey centres
1982 births